Cressa is a genus of plants in the morning glory family known generally as alkaliweeds. These plants are native to the tropical and subtropical areas of the world. They are clumpy and low-growing but usually have erect stems covered white-haired, green leaves. They produce tiny white flowers about half a centimeter across.

There are four species recognised in the genus Cressa:
Cressa australis
Cressa cretica
Cressa nudicaulis
Cressa truxillensis

Sources

External links
Jepson Manual Treatment

Convolvulaceae
Convolvulaceae genera